Vanja Panić (born 27 January 2002) is a Slovenian footballer who plays as a forward.

References

External links
 
 Vanja Panić at NZS 

2002 births
Living people
Sportspeople from Koper
Slovenian footballers
Slovenian expatriate footballers
Association football forwards
Slovenian expatriate sportspeople in Serbia
Expatriate footballers in Serbia
Red Star Belgrade footballers
RFK Grafičar Beograd players
FK Mačva Šabac players
NK Celje players
Serbian First League players
Serbian SuperLiga players
Slovenian Second League players
Slovenia youth international footballers